is a horizontally scrolling shooter video game developed by Sega and published by Sega in Japan and Europe and by Renovation Products in the United States for the Sega Mega Drive/Genesis in 1990. The game's main character pilots a prototype transformable fighter-mecha left from her grandfather to fight against an alien attack on humankind. The game is mostly a horizontal shooter, with one down scrolling stage.

Gameplay
Like many scrolling shooters, the player initially has a basic shot, which can be upgraded and/or exchanged for different weapons, as well as gain smaller ships that follow the player's ship around and copy its attacks. As is usual, these power-ups are distributed throughout the levels. They are retained when advancing to the next stage but lost entirely when the player loses a life.

Two additional mechanics differentiate Arrow Flash from similar scrolling shooters, one of which is the ability to transform the player's ship. The two forms available are a humanoid mech and a fighter jet, with the player's weapons changing depending on the form. The jet form only shoots forward but intensely, it can fly faster horizontally, and the helper ships follow the jet in a snakelike pattern. The mech form has a wider shooting angle (sometimes even firing backwards upon getting enough upgrades), has a faster vertical speed, and the helper ships remain in a fixed formation whilst in this form. Missiles will also home on enemies in mech form, whereas they only travel directly forward in jet form. Regardless of form, the ship is destroyed with only one hit unless the player picks up an energy shield, which can sustain three hits.

The game's titular "Arrow Flash" is a highly powerful ability, differing for each form: the jet fires five large blasts forward, while the mech form becomes engulfed in flame, rendering it immune to attacks for a short time. In the default "Stock" mode, Arrow Flashes are instant but limited, and must be used sparingly, while "Charge" mode allows arrow flashes to be used infinitely but with a weaker effect, and must be "charged up" before use.

Plot

Arrow Flash follows the protagonist Zana Keene (named Anna Schwinn in the European release, and Starna Oval in the Japanese release) as she fights against hostile aliens. The game contains references to Gundam and Macross.

Reception
Arrow Flash received mixed reviews, including 32/50 from ASM, 3/10 from Génération 4, 24% from Mega, 90% from Player One, 73% from RAZE, and 69% from Zero.

References

External links
 Arrow Flash at MobyGames
 Arrow Flash at GameFAQs

1990 video games
Horizontally scrolling shooters
Video games about mecha
Single-player video games
Sega Genesis games
Sega Genesis-only games
Sega video games
Video games featuring female protagonists
Video games developed in Japan